The Hindus: An Alternative History is a book by American Indologist Wendy Doniger which the author describes as an "alternative to the narrative of Hindu history that they tell". The book was initially published by Viking Penguin in 2009 and later in India by Penguin's Indian subsidiary, Penguin India.

The book was criticized in India, and in February 2014 it was the subject of litigation in India for "deliberate and malicious acts intended to outrage the feelings of any religious community". As a result of the lawsuit, the book was withdrawn from the Indian market by its Indian publisher, prompting widespread concerns about the state of free speech in India. Twenty months later, the book returned to the Indian market under a different publisher, Speaking Tiger Books.

Overview
The book, published in 2009 by Viking/Penguin, was explicitly intended as an alternative history of Hinduism, the mainstream history being (in the author's view) written from male Brahminical and white Orientalist perspectives. Doniger instead portrays the history of Hinduism from the point of view of women, dogs, horses and outcastes in a "playful, iconoclastic, and inherently controversial" style.

Reception
According to the Hindustan Times, The Hindus was a No. 1 bestseller in its non-fiction category in the week of October 15, 2009. Two scholarly reviews in the Social Scientist and the Journal of the American Oriental Society, though praising Doniger for her textual scholarship, criticized factual errors in her coverage of British colonialists in India and her lack of focus.

In the popular press, the book has received many positive reviews, for example from the Library Journal, the Times Literary Supplement, the New York Review of Books, the New York Times, and The Hindu.

In January 2010, the National Book Critics Circle named The Hindus as a finalist for its 2009 book awards. The Hindu American Foundation protested this decision, alleging inaccuracies and bias in the book.

Court case in India
While scholarly and popular reviews were by and large positive, it quickly drew much ire in the Indian blogosphere and the internet more generally, following what Taylor calls "a decade of bad blood, flaming, and hurtful personal attacks" following the publication of Kali's Child and several other controversial works.

The book was criticised by Shiksha Bachao Andolan Samithi (Hindi: शिक्षा बचाओ आंदोलन समिति, "Committee for Struggle to Save Education"), founded by Dinanath Batra, arguing that the work was "riddled with heresies" and that the contents are offensive to Hindus. In 2011 a lawsuit was filed by Dinanath Batra under Section 295A of Indian Penal Code, which forbids deliberate and malicious acts intended to outrage the feelings of any religious community, and in February 2014, it was the subject of litigation in India. The book was withdrawn from the Indian market by its Indian publisher, and the publisher Penguin India agreed to destroy all the existing copies within six months commencing from February 2014.

The publishers blamed the "British vintage Section 295A of IPC" for withdrawal of the books and felt that it was difficult to maintain international standards of free speech in light of this section. The decision to withdraw the book was widely criticised and certain thinkers felt that Penguin should have defended the case effectively and upheld freedom of expression. Widespread concerns were raised about the state of free speech in India.

There was a Streisand effect on the sales of withdrawn book as some bookstores continued to secretly sell the book, wrapped in brown paper.

According to plaintiff attorney Monika Arora, she merely asked the publisher Penguin to fix errors in the book. Arora says the withdrawal of the book by Penguin India and subsequent republishing under a different publisher was a scheme to avoid addressing factual errors in court.

See also
Censorship by religion
Censorship in India
Censorship in South Asia
Freedom of speech
Religious intolerance

Notes

References
 
 
 
 
 

2009 non-fiction books
21st-century Indian books
Books by Wendy Doniger
Censorship in India
English-language books
Indian non-fiction books
Indology
Viking Press books